A turbine trip is the emergency shutdown of a power-generation turbine due to unexpected events. Due to the number of issues that may cause a trip, they are relatively common events. Although it can occur on any such turbine, the term is most often seen in the field of nuclear power.

Many events can cause a turbine trip, including:

 turbine overspeed condition where the turbine accelerates over its design speed, typically by 10%
 low vacuum in the secondary cooling loop, or condenser
 lubrication failure for any number of reasons
 vibrations due to any number of issues

In order to trip the turbine, inlet steam has to be removed from the feed. This is normally accomplished with dump valves that re-route the feed stream from the turbine inlet directly into the condensers.

References 
 

Power station technology
Turbines